King Maker IV is a 2021 Hong Kong survival reality show on ViuTV as fourth season of , accepting only female contestants.

Aftermath
Two additional girl groups, namely Lolly Talk and Strayz, are also formed after the competition.

References

External links
Official YouTube Playlist

2020s Hong Kong television series
2021 in Hong Kong television
Cantonese-language television shows
Reality music competition television series